The Tokyo Princess Sho (in Japanese: 東京プリンセス賞), is a horse race for three-year-olds from South Kanto at Ohi Racecourse.

Race details

The first edition of the race took place on July 12, 1987.

The race was initially held in June and July, but is now held during April and May.

Winners since 2015

Winners since 2015 include:

Past winners
Past winners include:

See also
 Horse racing in Japan
 List of Japanese flat horse races

References

Horse races in Japan